In mathematics, and more specifically in graph theory, a polytree (also called directed tree, oriented tree or singly connected network) is a directed acyclic graph whose underlying undirected graph is a tree. In other words, if we replace its directed edges with undirected edges, we obtain an undirected graph that is both connected and acyclic.

A polyforest (or directed forest or oriented forest) is a directed acyclic graph whose underlying undirected graph is a forest. In other words, if we replace its directed edges with undirected edges, we obtain an undirected graph that is acyclic.

A polytree is an example of an oriented graph.

The term polytree was coined in 1987 by Rebane and Pearl.

Related structures

 An arborescence is a directed rooted tree, i.e. a directed acyclic graph in which there exists a single source node that has a unique path to every other node. Every arborescence is a polytree, but not every polytree is an arborescence. 
 A multitree is a directed acyclic graph in which the subgraph reachable from any node forms a tree. Every polytree is a multitree.
 The reachability relationship among the nodes of a polytree forms a partial order that has order dimension at most three.
 A fence or zigzag poset is a special case of a polytree in which the underlying tree is a path and the edges have orientations that alternate along the path. The reachability ordering in a polytree has also been called a generalized fence.

Enumeration

Sumner's conjecture
Sumner's conjecture, named after David Sumner, states that tournaments are universal graphs for polytrees, in the sense that every tournament with  vertices contains every polytree with  vertices as a subgraph.

Applications
Polytrees have been used as a graphical model for probabilistic reasoning. If a Bayesian network has the structure of a polytree, then belief propagation may be used to perform inference efficiently on it.

The contour tree of a real-valued function on a vector space is a polytree that describes the level sets of the function. The nodes of the contour tree are the level sets that pass through a critical point of the function and the edges describe contiguous sets of level sets without a critical point. The orientation of an edge is determined by the comparison between the function values on the corresponding two level sets.

See also
 Glossary of graph theory

Notes

References
 
 .
 .
 .
 .
 .
 .
.
 .
 .

Trees (graph theory)
Directed acyclic graphs